The 25th Aviation Regiment is an aviation regiment of the U.S. Army.

Structure

 1st Battalion (Attack Reconnisance)
 Company A (AH-64)
 Company B (AH-64)
 Company C (AH-64)
 Company D
 2nd Battalion "Diamondhead" (Assault)
 Headquarters and Headquarters Company (HHC)
 Company A "Blackjacks"(UH-60)
 Company B "Knighthawks"(UH-60)
 Company C "Wolfpack" (UH-60)
 Company D "Cannibals"
 Company E "Road Runner"

 3rd Battalion "Hammerheads" (General Support) 
 HHC "Marlins"
 Company A "Stingrays"(UH-60)
 Company B "Hillclimbers"(CH-47)
 Company C "Dustoff"(HH-60)
 Company D "Tiger sharks"
 Company E 
 Company F "Cobras" (Air Traffic Control)

Lineage
Constituted 1 February 1957 in the Regular Army as the 25th Aviation Company, assigned to the 25th Infantry Division, and activated at Schofield Barracks, Hawaii

Reorganized and redesignated 12 August 1963 as Headquarters and Headquarters Company, 25th Aviation Battalion (organic elements constituted 21 June 1963 and activated 12 August 1963).

Between 1966 and 1967 the 341st Airfield Operations Detachment was attached.

Inactivated 15 October 1985 at Schofield Barracks, Hawaii.

Activated 16 January 1986 at Wheeler Air Force Base, Hawaii

Relieved 16 May 1988 from assignment to the 25th Infantry Division; concurrently reorganized and redesignated as the 25th Aviation, a parent regiment under the United States Army Regimental System.

It may at its maximum size have had up to four battalions.

Campaign participation credit
Counteroffensive; Counteroffensive, Phase II; Counteroffensive, Phase III; Tet Counteroffensive; Counteroffensive, Phase IV; Counteroffensive, Phase V; Counteroffensive, Phase VI; Tet 69/Counteroffensive; Summer-Fall 1969; Winter-Spring 1970; Sanctuary Counteroffensive; Counteroffensive, Phase VII

Decorations
 Valorous Unit Award for HO BO WOODS
 Valorous Unit Award for TAY NINH – HAU NGHIA
 Valorous Unit Award for SOMALIA
 Meritorious Unit Commendation (Army) for VIETNAM 1966–1967
 Meritorious Unit Commendation (Army) for VIETNAM 1968
 Republic of Vietnam Cross of Gallantry with Palm for VIETNAM 1966–1968
 Republic of Vietnam Cross of Gallantry with Palm for VIETNAM 1968–1970
 Republic of Vietnam Civil Action Honor Medal for VIETNAM 1966–1970

See also
 List of United States Army aircraft battalions
 U.S. Army Regimental System
 United States Army Aviation Branch

References

External links
 http://www.history.army.mil/html/forcestruc/lineages/branches/av/default.htm
 https://web.archive.org/web/20110512225727/http://www.armyavnmuseum.org/index.html
 http://25thaviation.org/

025
Military units and formations established in 1957